"Excelsis Dei" is the eleventh episode of the second season of the science fiction television series The X-Files. It premiered in the United States on the Fox network on December 16, 1994. It was written by Paul Brown and directed by Stephen Surjik. The episode is a "Monster-of-the-Week" story, unconnected to the series' wider mythology. "Excelsis Dei" earned a Nielsen household rating of 8.9, being watched by 8.5 million households in its initial broadcast. The episode received mixed reviews from television critics; although some complimented the episode's effects, others were critical of the way the show handled rape.

The show centers on FBI special agents Fox Mulder (David Duchovny) and Dana Scully (Gillian Anderson) who work on cases linked to the paranormal, called X-Files. Mulder is a believer in the paranormal, while the skeptical Scully has been assigned to debunk his work. In the episode Mulder and Scully are called in to investigate a claim of rape made by a nurse at a nursing home; the case falls into the purview of the X-Files because the assailant appears to have been a disembodied spirit.

Surjik personally asked if he could direct the episode because he was a fan of the series; this was his only credit for the series. Filming the episode was difficult for the cast and crew due largely to the fact that the script arrived for the cast and crew to film only two days in advance. Other issues arose because of technical reasons; one scene required flooding a hallway with 3,300 gallons of water. Many of the scenes were filmed at Riverview Hospital, a mental health facility located in Coquitlam, British Columbia.

Plot

Agents Fox Mulder (David Duchovny) and Dana Scully (Gillian Anderson) are called to the Excelsis Dei private nursing home in Worcester, Massachusetts in order to investigate a nurse's claim that she was raped by an invisible entity. Severely bruised, Michelle Charters (Teryl Rothery) claims that she knows who was responsible and names the attacker as Hal Arden, an elderly resident of Excelsis Dei who suffers from Alzheimer's Disease. When questioned, Arden admits that he made sexual overtures to Michelle, but claims that it was harmless and that he is too elderly to have done anything. In turn, the hospital's administrator believes that Michelle has manufactured the rape allegation in order to extort money from the nursing home.

As Mulder and Scully investigate, they discover that many of the facility's Alzheimer's patients have shown significant improvement over their condition, a development that is not medically possible. Their doctor, Grago, attributes the patients' improvement to regimen he has applied using Deprenyl, an experimental drug that has so far shown negligible affect in patient studies. Before Mulder and Scully can make much headway, Hal Arden dies unexpectedly while his roommate, Stan Phillips, stands by, complicating the investigation further.

Worried about her father, Stan Phillips' daughter arrives to move him back into her home and Stan angrily declares he doesn't want to leave. An orderly arrives to help Stan pack and escort him out but Stan flees the room and leads the orderly on a chase to the roof. The orderly climbs out of a window in a half-hearted attempt to coax Stan back inside but falls or is pushed to his death before Mulder can save him. 

With two suspicious deaths in a twenty-four hour period and following Charters' rape, Mulder and Scully continue investigating, eventually discovering that a Malaysian orderly, Gung Bitten, is dosing the patients with an herbal drug made of mushrooms he cultivates in the building's basement. He explains that in his culture, the elderly are revered and it is considered a great honor to care for them; coming to America, he was appalled to see how Westerners treat the elderly, even their own parents, like garbage, sending them away to places like Excelsis Dei, whereas Gung has seen firsthandthey are treated little better than animals. Gung attempted to ease their suffering with the herbal dose, but admits something has gone badly wrong. While the mushrooms are used in his country to "speak with the dead," the spirits lingering around Excelsis Dei are restless and angry, and the living residents' use of the mushrooms has given them the power to act on that anger. The drug reverse the patients' Alzheimer's, but also allows them to channel the spirits into existence and the spirits have been assaulting and murdering the orderlies that treated them poorly while they were patients.

As Stan, who stole all of Gung's herbal stash, overdoses and begins seizing, the spirits once again attack Charters, trapping her and Mulder in the bathroom, which begins flooding. Scully and Dr. Grago manage to stop Stan's seizures but he expires, at which point the spirits disappear and the bathroom door opens, freeing Mulder and Charters. The government of Massachusetts takes over the facility, and Gung is turned over to immigration services. The remaining original patients, no longer having access to the drug, revert to their previous state of dementia.

Production

"Excelsis Dei" was written by Paul Brown, his final script for the series after the earlier episode "Ascension". The episode was directed by Stephen Surjik (his only credit for the series), who had reached out to the show's producers and requested a chance to direct an episode because he was a fan of the show.

Production for this episode was notoriously difficult, and the book The Complete X-Files notes that it "gave the staff headaches—both during the shoot and editing process". Part of this was due to the script being delivered to the cast and crew only two days before filming was scheduled to begin. One part of the episode that was nixed during the writing stage was an extended look at Michelle's love life: originally, she was explicitly described as a lesbian, and in one short scene her partner enters her apartment to talk to her. Series creator Chris Carter eventually cut the scene because he felt it "felt gratuitous at that point".

Many of the scenes were filmed at Riverview Hospital, a psychiatric hospital located in Coquitlam, British Columbia. During on-site production, several of the members of the show's cast and crew claimed that they heard mysterious voices, and they refused to "venture into the bowels of the building" for fear that it was haunted. In order to film the scene featuring the bathroom door bursting with water—a scene Matt Hurwitz and Chris Knowles called "nail-biting"—special effects supervisor Dave Gauthier built a massive tank that was rigged to flood the set hallway with 3,300 gallons of water.

The episode features several actresses that had previously had parts in other episodes of The X-Files. Tasha Simms, who portrayed the daughter of Stan Phillips in the episode, had previously played the part of Cindy Reardon's mother in the first season episode "Eve". Sheila Moore, who had appeared as a background character in the episode "Deep Throat" appears in the episode as the nursing home's director.

Broadcast and reception

"Excelsis Dei" premiered in the United States on the Fox network on December 16, 1994. This episode earned a Nielsen rating of 8.9, with a 15 share, meaning that roughly 8.9 percent of all television-equipped households, and 15 percent of households watching television, were tuned in to the episode. It was viewed by 8.5 million households.

Critical reception to the episode was mostly mixed. Entertainment Weekly gave the episode a grade of B−, calling it "offbeat and cute". Zack Handlen from The A.V. Club was mixed, writing that "the handling of the rape case left a bad taste in my mouth" and that the resolution was "a bit fuzzy". Sarah Stegall awarded the episode three stars out of five, and wrote that it "could have gotten five [stars] out of five", but that the episode's lack of closure and the presence of too many questions left unresolved caused it to be less than one of the series' best installments. Robert Shearman, in the book Wanting to Believe: A Critical Guide to The X-Files, Millennium & The Lone Gunmen, gave the episode a largely critical review and rated it one star out of five. Shearman referred to the episode as "the idiot's version" of the previous season-two episode "One Breath". Shearman also derided how the episode handled the rape element, noting that "there's a sour atmosphere to the whole proceedings"; he further pointed out that "only Scully shows the slightest concern that a woman's been sexually assaulted." And while Shearman felt that the ghost effects "eerie", he concluded that the scripting was "very stupid".

Footnotes

Bibliography

External links 

"Excelsis Dei" on TheXFiles.com
 

1994 American television episodes
Television episodes about ghosts
Television episodes set in Massachusetts
The X-Files (season 2) episodes
Television episodes about rape